Claude Dhotel (born 21 December 1946 in Paris, France; died 14 March 2000), better known by his stage name C. Jérôme, was a French singer.

Biography
Raised by his grandparents, he grew up in Champenoux, a village of Meurthe-et-Moselle near Nancy, France. At 16 he starred in "The Storms", a rock'n'roll band. He then tried his luck in Paris where he attended the Golf-Drouot to mix with personalities of the music world. He finally met Jean Albertini who became his producteur.

Career
Claude Dhotel had a musical career of three decades, selling 26 million records; he was particularly popular in the 1970s.

In 1967, Dhotel recorded his first 45 rpm vinyl disc Les Fiancés, under the pseudonym C.Jérôme. This first shot did not reach success, unlike Le petit Chaperon rouge est mort, and Quand la mer se retire that he sang on the TV show "Salut les copains".

In 1972, Jérôme's first big hit Kiss Me reached 1st place in the French music charts, 3rd in Austria, 4th in Belgium, and 5th in Switzerland. More than a million copies have been sold.

In 1974, C. Jérôme's song C’est moi became a huge success. This one will stay in the collective memory.

Jérôme sang other hits until 1977 Himalaya, Manhattan, La Petite Fille 73, C'est moi, Baby Boy, Cindy, Le Charme français, Rétro c'est trop...).

In 1985, C. Jérôme released Et tu danses avec lui (written by Dider Barbelivien) which remained more than 6 months in the top 50.

In 1986, Jérôme's song Dernier Baisers was his last being in the top charts. The same year he also took part in the collective song Liban.

C. Jérôme then wrote other classic songs in the 90s, such as Danielle s’en va, Les manons de la Nuit, Pardonne moi, A pleins tubes, and many more.

Carriere on tv and radio 

In 1995, C. Jérôme became host of radio Monte-Carlo where he introduced "Les années tubes" every morning with Claire Cardell. In 1996, he got a job at TF1 (national TV in France) where he presented a daily show called "La chanson trésor". He also joined Michel Drucker in the TV show "Vivement Dimanche".

Private life and death 

C.Jérôme married Annette Dhôtel, with whom he had a daughter Caroline, born in 1977. She became a singing teacher.

In August 1997, C.Jérôme was treated for a tumor in the abdomen (cancer). He overcame the disease and recorded other songs, but the cancer returned in 1999.

C.Jérôme died 14 March 2000, aged 53. C.Jérôme is buried at the graveyard of Boulogne-Billancourt. His widow released a book in 2003 "C.Jérôme, c’est lui" in which she tells his fight against the illness.

Discography 
 Kiss Me - #1 in France April 1972, #3 in Austria, #4 in Belgium
 Himalaya - #2 in France Nov 1972
 Manhattan - #5 in France May 1973
 C'est moi - #2 in France #6 in Netherlands June 1974
 Baby boy - #3 in France Nov 1974
 Cindy - #6 in France
 Et tu danses avec lui
 Dernier baiser
 Le Charme français
 Le petit chaperon rouge est mort
 Quand la mer se retire
 La Petite Fille 73
 Rétro c'est trop
 Julie à la folie
 Ne m'abandonne pas
 It's so long
 Hop la dites-moi
 Un ticket pour une blonde
 Caroline et moi
 Un enfant malheureux
 Bay-bay 26–38
 Les Manons de la nuit
 Les Bords de l'Atlantique
 Les Filles du sam'di soir
 Les Larmes aux yeux
 Comme si
 À pleins tubes
 Nancy
 Nuits blanches
 Le Nom des Hallyday
 Chanson pour Carole
 16 ans déjà
 Le Temps d'un été
 Te moque pas du p'tit homme
 L'Enfant aux cheveux d'or
 Pleure pas pour moi
 Je ne parl'rai plus d'elle
 Symphonie pour une tristesse
 La Fille au regard vert
 Je suis Dieu
 Les Bleus Lendemains
 La P'tite Fille de Bretagne
 Danièle s'en va
 Chanter
 Là où je t'aime
 J'ai retrouvé le soleil
 Pardonne-moi
 Qu'est-ce que je t'aime
 Amants
 Je
 C'est l'Amérique
 Rien qu'un baladin
 Elle me ressemble
 Graine de star
 Deauville
 L'Encre de Chine
 J'taime
 Help remember
 La Fièvre
 Âge tendre et tête de bois
 Je flashe pour elle
 Ma romantique
 Qu'est-ce que tu veux que j'te dise
 Encore un métro qui passe
 De quoi nos vies sont faites
 Quinze ans
 Adieu my love
 Margarita
 La ballade de Mary James
 Femme enfant femme enfin
 In love
 C'est la nuit
 Les Sentiments à la menthe
 Si tu me laisses
 Dingue de rock
 Les Fiancés
 Non
 Joëlle
 Ma belle
 Il faut que je t'oublie
 Dans la chambre d'amour
 Une guitare
 La Musique classique
 Chagrin d'amour
 Les Lilas
 L'Orphelin
 Cendrillon
 Le Jardin d'amour
 Mélancolie
 Petite fille
 Caroline
 Belle
 La Poupée désarticulée
 Passionnément
 Mille et une nuits d'amour
 Comme au bon Dieu
 Terminus
 Un amour
 Un cri
 Un p'tit air d'accordéon
 Pardon
 J'anbandonnerai ma vie
 Un rôle dans l'rock
 Marilyn
 Par désespoir
 Hasard bizarre
 Imagination
 C'est défendu
 Quand tu danses
 Sixtees rendez-vous
 Amour interdit
 Un enfant
 Le Bassiste
 Au royaume de la musique
 J'suis dans l'coup
 Discopyright
 Les mamans
 Pour mon plaisir
 Roman-photos
 Le Monde à l'envers
 Miss Mélodie
 Eve et moi
 D'j
 Drôle de mec
 P'tit bonhomme
 Avec les filles
 De Ritchie à Donna
 Confidence
 Seul
 Belle histoire vécue
 Par désespoir
 J'avais douze ans
 Grand-père
 Hommage à Mike Brant
 It's live (ou It's life)
 Je vis comme je veux
 Je ne pense qu'à chanter
 L'Indienne
 Je veux te chanter
 La Vie d'artiste
 Quand tu danses
 Eve et moi
 Sam'di soir
 Une fille aux yeux clairs
 L'amour n'est pas une chanson
 Souvenirs 78

References

External links 
 Official site
 Rétro Jeunesse 60 page

1946 births
2000 deaths
French pop singers
20th-century French male singers